This list of songs about Barcelona is a list of songs referencing the city of Barcelona.
 "Barcelona postal" by Jaume Sisa (1982)
 "Barcelona ciudad" by Loquillo (1983)
 "Barcelone" by Yves Simon (1983)
 "Barcelona" by Freddie Mercury & Montserrat Caballé (1987)
 "Indios de Barcelona" by Mano Negra (1988)
 "Barcelona i jo" by Joan Manuel Serrat (1989)
 "Barcelona Nights" by Ottmar Liebert (1990)
 "Gitana hechicera" by Peret (1992)
 "Hilton Barcelona" by Stef Bos (1994)
 "Barcelona" by Jewel (1998)
 "Barcelona" by Rufus Wainwright (1998)
 "Rumba de Barcelona" by Manu Chao (2002)
 "A Barcelona" by Manolo Escobar (2002)
 "Luna de Barcelona" by Skalariak (2003)
 "Barcelona" by BLØF (2003)
 "We're from Barcelona" by I'm from Barcelona (2006)
 "Barcelona Loves You" by I'm from Barcelona (2006)
 "Barcelona" by Louie Austen (2007)
 "Barcelona" by BWO (2008)
 "Barcelona en colors" by Gerard Quintana (2009)
 "Barcelona" by Obrint Pas (2011)
 "Barcelona" by Pectus (2012)
 "Barcelona" by George Ezra (2015)
 "Barcelona s'il·lumina" by Buhos (2016)
 "Barcelona" by Ed Sheeran (2017)
 "Barcelona" by Alfred García (2018)
 "Barcelona" by Eleni Foureira (2019)
 "Barcelona" by Jack & Jack (2019)
 "Barcelona" by Brother Leo (2019)
 "A Song for Barcelona" by Jackson Browne (2021)
 "Barcelona" by Police Dog Hogan (2022)

Barcelona
Songs
Culture in Barcelona